The 2019 Men's FIH Olympic Qualifiers was the final stage of the qualification for the men's field hockey event at the 2020 Summer Olympics. It was held in October and November 2019.

Format
In the first part of the qualification, the five continental champions automatically gained an Olympic berth, where they were joined by the hosts, Japan. Originally, twelve teams were to take part in the Olympic qualifying events. These teams were to be drawn into six pairs; each pair playing a two-match, aggregate score series, and the winner of each series qualifying for the Olympics. As Japan won the 2018 Asian Games (thereby qualifying twice, once as host and once as Asian champions), there instead were 14 teams, seven of whom qualified. The seven Olympic qualifiers each featured two nations playing two back-to-back matches, with nations drawn to play each other based on their rankings at the end of the 2018 / 2019 Continental Championships. It was held in October and November 2019 and the matches were hosted by the higher-ranked of the two competing nations.

Qualification

The participating teams were confirmed on 29 August 2019 by the International Hockey Federation.

Seeding
The seeding was announced on 8 September 2019.

Overview
The first legs were played on 25 and 26 October or 1 and 2 November 2019, and the second legs on 26 and 27 October or 2 and 3 November 2019.

All times are local.

Matches

Spain won 6–5 on aggregate.

Netherlands won 10–5 on aggregate.

6–6 on aggregate. Canada won 5–4 after penalty-shootout.

India won 11–3 on aggregate.

New Zealand won 6–2 on aggregate.

Germany won 10–3 on aggregate.

Great Britain won 9–3 on aggregate.

Goalscorers

Notes

See also
2019 Women's FIH Olympic Qualifiers

References

External links
International Hockey Federation

FIH Olympic Qualifiers
FIH Olympic Qualifiers
Field hockey at the Summer Olympics – Men's qualification tournaments